The following is a list of Royal Flying Corps generals. While officially general officers are not considered to belong to any regiment or corps (simply being "late" of their erstwhile regiment), in practice almost all the general officers to hold a Royal Flying Corps-related appointment gained their promotion to the general officer ranks in that appointment and remained in such appointments until the creation of the Royal Air Force on 1 April 1918. Royal Flying Corps generals then became Royal Air Force generals.

Two officers took up Royal Flying Corps related appointments while holding general officer rank: David Henderson was already a brigadier-general when the Royal Flying Corps was established, and Edward Ellington was promoted to brigadier-general while serving on the General Staff of the British VIII Corps in France, prior to taking up appointment as Deputy Director-General of Military Aeronautics. Conversely, Duncan MacInnes gained his promotion to brigadier-general while serving at the Military Aeronautics Directorate but subsequently served with the Royal Engineers.

Senior generals 
Ranks indicated are the highest rank the officer obtained while in the RFC.

In addition to the above generals, Brigadier-General N J G Cameron was a member of the Royal Flying Corps reserve who had qualified as a military pilot.  Unlike the above generals, Cameron never held a Royal Flying Corps appointment.

General officer appointments and incumbents

War Office
Director-General of Military Aeronautics
Sir David Henderson (1913–17)
J M Salmond (1917–18)
E. L. Ellington (1918)
Deputy Director-General of Military Aeronautics
W S Brancker (1917)
E. L. Ellington (1917–18)
Director of Air Organization
W S Brancker (1916–17)
L E O Charlton (1917)
G Livingston (1917–18)
Director of Aircraft Equipment
D S MacInnes (1916–17)
W B Caddell (1917)
A Huggins (1917–18)

Commands
General Officer Commanding the Royal Flying Corps in the Field (for France and Belgium)
Sir David Henderson (1914)
F H Sykes (1914) – did not hold general officer rank
Sir David Henderson (1914–15)
H M Trenchard (1915–18)
J M Salmond (1918) – continued to hold equivalent post in the RAF until 1919
General Officer Commanding, Training Division
J M Salmond (1917)
C A H Longcroft (1917–1918)
E R Ludlow-Hewitt (1918)
General Officer Commanding, London Air Defence Area
E B Ashmore (1917–1918)
General Officer Commanding, Royal Flying Corps Middle East
W S Brancker (1917–1918)
W G H Salmond (1918)

Staff Officers
 Brigadier General General Staff, Royal Flying Corps in the Field
P W Game (1916–1918)
 Deputy Adjutant and Quartermaster General, Royal Flying Corps in the Field
 H R M Brooke-Popham (1916–1917)
Deputy Quartermaster General, Royal Flying Corps in the Field
 H R M Brooke-Popham (1917–1918)
Deputy Adjutant General, Royal Flying Corps in the Field
F L Festing (1917–1918)
 Brigadier General Royal Flying Corps Staff, Training Division
G Livingston (1917)
J G Hearson (1917–1918)
 Inspector of Training, Training Division
E R Ludlow-Hewitt (1917–1918)

Brigades
In late 1915 brigades started to be established in the RFC and so brigadier-generals were created. A list of brigade command appointments is at List of Royal Flying Corps brigades.

References

 *
Lists of British military personnel
British Royal Flying Corps